This page shows the results of the inaugural Women's Beach Volleyball Tournament at the 1996 Summer Olympics in Atlanta, Georgia, held from July 23 to July 27, 1996. There were a total number of eighteen participating couples.

Results

Winner’s Bracket, First-round
Kaize/Yudhani, Indonesia (No. 17-seeded team) def. Malowney/Oullette, Canada (16), 15-10 (44 minutes)
Prawerman/Lesage, France (18) def. Hernandez/Soto, Mexico (15) 15-11 (28)

Winner’s Bracket, Second-round
Fenwick/Spring, Australia (9) def. Fujita/Takahashi, Japan (8), 15-10 (26)
Rodrigues/Samuel, Brazil (5) def. Solazzi/Turetta, Italy (12) 17-15 (57)
Fontana/Hanley, United States (4) def. Berntsen/Hestad, Norway (13) 15-4 (41)
Castro/Richardson, United States (3) def. Kadijk/Van de Ven, Netherlands (14) 15-8 (34)
Cook/Pottharst, Australia (6) def. Cooper/Glover, England (11) 15-4 (38)
Buhler/Müsch, Germany (7) def. Ishizaka/Nakano, Japan (10) 15-8 (36)
Silva/Pires, Brazil (1) def. Kaize/Yudhani, Indonesia (17) 15-2 (26)
McPeak/Reno, United States (2) def. Prawerman/Lesage, France (18) 15-4 (33)

Winner’s Bracket, Third-round
Silva/Pires, Brazil (1) def. Fenwick/Spring, Australia (9), 15-13 (45)
Rodrigues/Samuel, Brazil (5) def. Fontana/Hanley, United States (4), 15-10 (55)
Cook/Pottharst, Australia (6) def. Castro/Richardson, United States (3), 15-7 (38)
McPeak/Reno, United States (2) def. Buhler/Müsch, Germany (7), 15-6 (36)

Winner’s Bracket, Fourth-round
Silva/Pires, Brazil (1) def. Rodrigues/Samuel, Brazil (5), 15-4 (33)
Cook/Pottharst, Australia (6) def. McPeak/Reno, United States (2), 15-13 (65)

Loser’s Bracket, First-round
Losers eliminated, place 17th
Prawerman/Lesage, France (18) def. Malowney/Oullette, Canada (16), 15-13 (68)
Kaize/Yudhani, Indonesia (17) def. Hernandez/Soto, Mexico (15) 15-11 (29)

Loser’s Bracket, Second-round
Losers eliminated, place 13th
Cooper/Glover, England (11) def. Kadijk/Van de Ven, Netherlands (14), 15-12 (50)
Berntsen/Hestad, Norway (13) def. Solazzi/Turetta, Italy (12) 15-11 (42)
Ishizaka/Nakano, Japan (10) def. Prawerman/Lesage, France (18) (26)
Fujita/Takahashi, Japan (8) def. Kaize/Yudhani, Indonesia (17), 15-0 (18)

Loser’s Bracket, Third-round
Losers eliminated, place ninth
Fontana/Hanley, United States (4) def. Ishizaka/Nakano, Japan (10), 15-6 (32)
Fenwick/Spring, Australia (9) def. Cooper/Glover, England (11), 15-12 (38)
Buhler/Müsch, Germany (7) def. Berntsen/Hestad, Norway (13), 15-9 (45)
Fujita/Takahashi, Japan (8) def. Castro/Richardson, United States (3), 15-11 (49)

Loser’s Bracket, Fourth-round
Losers eliminated, place seventh
Fontana/Hanley, United States (4) def. Fenwick/Spring, Australia (9), 15-6 (37)
Fujita-Takahashi, Japan (8) def. Buhler/Müsch, Germany (7), 15-4 (32)

Loser’s Bracket, Fifth-round
Losers eliminated, place fifth
Fontana/Hanley, United States (4) def. McPeak/Reno, United States (2), 15-10 (49)
Rodrigues/Samuel, Brazil(5) def. Fujita/Takahashi, Japan (8), 15-6 (45)

Semi-finals
Silva/Pires, Brazil (1) def. Fontana/Hanley, United States (4), 15-8 (39)
Rodrigues/Samuel, Brazil (5) def. Cook/Pottharst, Australia (6), 15-3 (27)

Bronze medal match
Cook/Pottharst, Australia (6) def. Fontana/Hanley, United States (4), 12-11 and 12-7 (111)

Gold Medal match
Silva/Pires, Brazil (1) def. Rodrigues/Samuel, Brazil (5), 12-11 and 12-6 (69)

Final ranking

See also
 Men's Beach Volleyball Tournament
 Volleyball at the Summer Olympics

References
 Beach Volleyball Results

O
Volleyball at the 1996 Summer Olympics
1996
1996 in women's volleyball
Women's events at the 1996 Summer Olympics